Alexey Alexeyevich Troitsky (March 14, 1866 – August 1942; also Alexei, Troitzky, Troitzki) was a Russian chess theoretician. He is widely considered to have been one of the greatest composers of chess endgame studies. He is widely regarded as the founder of the modern art of composing chess studies . Troitsky died of starvation during World War II at the siege of Leningrad, where his notes were destroyed. 

One of his most famous works involves analyzing the endgame with two knights versus a pawn, see Troitsky line.  John Nunn analyzed this endgame with an endgame tablebase and stated that "the analysis of Troitsky ... is astonishingly accurate" .

Compositions

Troitsky was a prolific composer of endgame studies.  Irving Chernev included nine of them in his book 200 Brilliant Endgames. The diagram shows one of them.
 
The main line goes:
1. Nb6! Qe8
2. Nd7! Kc4
3. Qxc7+ Kb4
4. Qc5+ Kb3
5. Qc3+ Ka4
6. Qd4+ Ka3
7. Nc5 Qb8
8. Qa1+ Kb4
9. Na6+
and White wins .

Books
 Troitzky, A. (1924), 500 Endspielstudien, Verlag Kagan Berlin

 Troitzky, A. (1992), Collection of Studies, Tschaturanga Ed. Olms, .  Reprinted in 2006 by Ishi Press, . The 360 studies above plus a supplement on the theory of the endgame of two knights against pawns.

See also
Two knights endgame (contains Troitsky line)

Notes

References

External links
 Troitzky Chess, invented by Paul Byway, a chess variant where checkmate by two knights can be forced.

1866 births
1942 deaths
Deaths by starvation
Chess composers
Chess theoreticians
Russian chess writers
Victims of the Siege of Leningrad